is a Japanese actress.

Career
Takashima starred in Shinji Aoyama's 1999 film, EM Embalming. She has also appeared in films such as K-20: Legend of the Mask, Railways and Space Battleship Yamato.

Filmography

Film
 Like a Rolling Stone (1994)
 Ruby Fruit (1995)
 Shomuni (1998)
 Dreammaker (1999)
 EM Embalming (1999)
 Sennen no Koi Story of Genji (2001)
 The Boat to Heaven (2003)
 Tsuribaka Nisshi 14 (2003)
 Jusei: Last Drop of Blood (2003)
 Half a Confession (2004)
 The Hidden Blade (2004)
 2/2 (2005)
 Yakuza Wives: Burning Desire (2005)
 Azumi 2: Death or Love (2005)
 The Ode to Joy (2006)
 Adiantum Blue (2006)
 Oh! Oku (2006)
 Last Love (2007 film) (2007)
 Cahcha (2007)
 K-20: Legend of the Mask (2008)
 10 Promises to My Dog (2008)
 Pride (2009)
 Killer Virgin Road (2009)
 Dear Heart (2009)
 Space Battleship Yamato (2010)
 Railways (2010)
 Ranhansha (2011)
 Home: Itoshi no Zashiki Warashi (2012)
 Genesect and the Legend Awakened (2013)
 The Next Generation -Patlabor- (2015)
 Sakura Guardian in the North (2018)
 Omiokuri (2018)
 Anoko no Toriko (2018)
 JK Rock (2019)
 Howling Village (2020)
 Apparel Designer (2020)
 Inori (2021)
 The Lone Ume Tree (2021)
 The One I Long to See (2023)

Television
 Ōoku (2004) – Oeyo
 Kekkon Dekinai Otoko (2006)
 Tenchijin (2009) – Sentō-In
 Carnation (2011)
 Angel Heart (2015) - Saeko Nogami
 Moribito: Guardian of the Spirit (2016) – Torogai
 Atashinchi no Danshi (2009) - Koganei Kyoko
 Yamato Nadeshiko Shichi Henge (2010) - Nakahara Mine (Oba-san)
 Shiroi Kyotō (2019) - Masako Azuma

Dubbing
 Atlantis: The Lost Empire (2001) – Lieutenant Helga Katrina Sinclair

References

External links
 
 
 

Japanese voice actresses
1964 births
Living people
People from Yokohama